José Quintana may refer to:
Changuito (born 1948; as José Luís Quintana), Cuban percussionist
José Quintana (born 1989), Major League Baseball player
José Luis Naranjo y Quintana (born 1944), Mexican politician

See also
 José Quintanilla (disambiguation)